Wayne Duke is a former Australian rules footballer, who played for the Fitzroy Football Club in the Victorian Football League (VFL).

References

External links

1955 births
Living people
Fitzroy Football Club players
East Perth Football Club players
South Warrnambool Football Club players
Australian rules footballers from Victoria (Australia)